John Moyer (born February 24, 1975) is a former American football defensive lineman known mostly for his time with the Chicago Rush of the Arena Football League. He played college football at Eastern Illinois. As a member of the Rush, Moyer was a four-time All-Arena selection from 2002 to 2005, while also twice earning All-Ironman Team honors and being named the Lineman of the Year in 2004.

Professional career

Indianapolis Colts
Moyer signed with the Indianapolis Colts after going undrafted in the 1997 NFL Draft, but he was waived before the season started.

Florida Bobcats
From 1999 to 2001, Moyer played with the Florida Bobcats of the Arena Football League. Moyer played both offensive and defensive line.

Chicago Rush
On December 10, 2001, Moyer was selected by the Chicago Rush in the dispersal draft. From 2002 to 2008, Moyer played with the Rush. As a member of the Rush, Moyer was a four-time All-Arena selection from 2002 to 2005, while also twice earning All-Ironman Team honors and being named the Lineman of the Year in 2004. On May 29, 2011, the Rush retired Moyer's #99 jersey.

References

External links
Chicago Rush bio

1975 births
Living people
American football defensive tackles
American football defensive ends
Eastern Illinois Panthers football players
Florida Bobcats players
Chicago Rush players
Indianapolis Colts players